Coffee ceremony of Ethiopia and Eritrea is a core cultural custom in Ethiopia and Eritrea. There is a routine of serving coffee daily, mainly for the purpose of getting together with relatives, neighbors, or other visitors.  If coffee is politely declined, then tea will most likely be served. 

Loose grass is spread on the floor where the coffee ceremony is held, often decorated with small yellow flowers. Composite flowers are sometimes used, especially around the celebration of Meskel (an Orthodox Holiday celebrated by Eritreans and  Ethiopians).

Brewing
The ceremony is typically performed by the woman of the household and is considered an honor. The coffee is brewed by first roasting the green coffee beans over an open flame in a pan. This is followed by the grinding of the beans, traditionally in a wooden mortar and pestle. The coffee grounds are then put into a special vessel which contains boiling water and will be left on an open flame for a couple of minutes until it is well mixed with the hot water. After grinding, the coffee is put through a sieve several times. The boiling pot (jebena) is usually made of pottery and has a spherical base, a neck and pouring spout, and a handle where the neck connects with the base. The jebena also has a straw lid.

Serving

The host pours the coffee for all participants by moving the tilted boiling pot over a tray with small, handleless cups from a height of one foot without stop until each cup is full. The grounds are brewed three times: the first round of coffee is called awel in Tigrinya, the second kale'i and the third baraka ('to be blessed'). In Amharic it's አቦል abol, the second tona (Amharic: ቶና) and the third baraka (Amharic: በረካ). The coffee ceremony may also include burning of various traditional incense. People add sugar to their coffee, or in the countryside, sometimes salt or traditional butter (see niter kibbeh). The beverage is accompanied by a small snack such as popcorn, peanuts, or himbasha (also called ambasha).

See also

Tea ceremony
Cuisine of Eritrea
Cuisine of Ethiopia

References

External links

, Ethiopian Coffee Ceremony Video run by ethiopiancoffeeceremony.com 
Ethiopian Coffee Ceremony in photos at Canadian Photographer series on the Ethiopian Coffee Ceremony
What is the Coffee Ceremony, a multimedia primer on the Coffee Ceremony run by Bunna Cafe

Eritrean culture
Ethiopian culture
Coffee culture